The 2020 Summer Paralympics torch relay was held from 12 August 2021 to 24 August 2021. After being lit in multiple locations in Japan and Great Britain, the torch was intended to travel around Japan and end in Tokyo's New National Stadium, the main venue of the 2020 Summer Paralympics. The relay took place on a smaller scale than the Olympic relay, starting in Tokyo, with local flames lighted through Saitama, Chiba and Shizuoka prefectures where events of the games were held. The relay ended at the 2020 Summer Paralympics opening ceremony. The LIXIL Corporation was the presenting partner of the torch relay.

Relay
The relay started with Flame festivals planned in 43 of prefectures of Japan, as well as additional locations hosting the Paralympics. On 20 August, the flames from each location will be brought together as one, along with an additional flame from Stoke Mandeville, Great Britain, the birthplace of the Paralympic movement, to become a single Paralympic Flame at a ceremony in Tokyo. From 21–25 August, the one flame will follow a single route, culminating at the New National Stadium for the opening ceremonies.

Route in Japan

Tokyo metropolitan leg

Ceremony changes
Due to the ongoing COVID-19 pandemic and several prefectures declared state of emergency amid COVID-19 surge and in Shizuoka Prefecture's case, the 2021 Atami landslide, many of the public stages of the relay were truncated to be more ceremonial rather than functional such as alternative events. Participants of the relay would carry the torch for about 30 meters before passing the flame to another participant rather than carrying it for long stretches.

End of torch relay
At the 2020 Summer Paralympics opening ceremony, the relay ended with the lighting of the cauldron. Yui Kamiji, Karin Morisaki, and Shunsuke Uchida lit the cauldron.

References

External links
 Tokyo 2020 Paralympic Torch Relay official website

Torch Relay, 2020 Summer Paralympics
Paralympic torch relays